The Maryland SoccerPlex is a sports complex in Germantown, Maryland, although its mailing address is Boyds, Maryland. The facility, completed in 2000 and operated by the Maryland Soccer Foundation (MSF), has 21 natural grass fields, 3 artificial turf fields, and 8 indoor convertible basketball/volleyball courts.

In the park there are also two miniature golf courses, a splash park, a driving range, an archery course, community garden, model boat pond, a bike park featuring a linked jump line and a pump track, tennis center, and a swim center.

Planning and funding
The Maryland SoccerPlex was completed in 2000 with $15 million raised by a group of Montgomery County, Maryland soccer parents led by Discovery Communications chairman John Hendricks and his wife Maureen (also co-founders of Washington Freedom soccer team) through private donations and government-backed bonds. It was built as a private-public partnership between the Maryland Soccer Foundation, created in 1997 to build and operate the complex, and the Maryland-National Capital Park and Planning Commission.

However, initial revenues fell short of projections and the foundation took on $14 million in debt, nearly triple the amount projected, and the Hendrickses donated a further $6 million in 2005 to stabilize funding and build additional fields.

Overview

The main stadium holds 4,000 and was home to the Washington Freedom during its time in the Women's Professional Soccer, and the Washington Spirit of the National Women's Soccer League played its regular-season games there between 2013 and 2019

The main stadium was renamed Maureen Hendricks Field in a ceremony before a Spirit game on June 15, 2013.

On December 31, 2018, the founding executive director, Trish Heffelfinger, retired from the Maryland Soccer Foundation.  Matt Libber, formerly of Elite Tournaments, took over the executive director role in January 2019.

The stadium features seating for 4,000, including the general admission lawn, with corresponding restroom facilities, formal press box, and box office. The grass playing field measures 115 x 75 yards.

The stadium has previously hosted a US Olympic qualifier, U.S. Open Cup matches, a CONCACAF Champions League match, the ACC Men's Soccer Championships, USL and W League matches, training sessions for Argentina's Boca Juniors and the New Zealand National team. The US Youth Soccer National Championships were also held at the Maryland SoccerPlex.

References

External links

Washington Freedom
Soccer venues in Maryland
Women's Professional Soccer stadiums
Real Maryland F.C.
Sports venues completed in 2000
2000 establishments in Maryland
Former National Women's Soccer League stadiums
Washington Spirit
Defunct National Premier Soccer League stadiums
Sports complexes in the United States
National Independent Soccer Association stadiums
Lacrosse venues in Maryland